Bahnus (Korean: 바누스) whose real name is Lee Jae-young (Korean: 이재영) is a South Korean composer and producer. Until May 10, 2010, he was a member and leader of Bahnus Vacuum, a group which consisted of seven composers. Bahnus Vacuum disbanded May 25, 2010, following a plagiarism scandal.

Plagiarism

H-Logic by Lee Hyori
Bahnus worked with South Korean singer and actress Lee Hyori on her album H-Logic which was released on April 12, 2010. This collaboration came as a surprise to many, because Bahnus was introduced as a rookie songwriter, as where Lee Hyori is a senior celebrity. Bahnus was credited as composer for seven out of 14 tracks listed on H-Logic. All of the songs for which Bahnus received credit were accused of being plagiarized, by netizens.

Even after several statements by Mnet Media (now Stone Music Entertainment), Lee Hyori's record label at that moment, the accusations weren't dropped. Netizens even found ways to contact the original artists of the plagiarized songs, these artists claimed they never heard of Bahnus or Lee Jae-young, and were shocked to find out about this issue. Some artists decided to hire lawyers to deal with the issue.

The legal battle between Mnet Media and Bahnus, who is charged with fraud and obstruction of operations, was expected to be the largest in K-pop history. On September 14, 2010, the composer was indicted for plagiarizing seven songs on H-Logic, costing 29 million won, but was also charged with swindling an entertainment business official for 30 million won by fabricating his contract with an international record company.

Mnet Media stated that Bahnus had lied to them. According to his fake curriculum vitae, Lee Jae-young went to Yonsei University where he studied law school, but he dropped out and went to study at Guildhall School of Music and Drama in England where he received his bachelor's and master's degrees in jazz composition, then he went for University of Music and Dance Cologne in Germany where he got his Jazz master's degree in music.

Listing of the seven plagiarized tracks:
 "I'm Back" is originally by Canadian singer Lil' Precious and its original is named "So Insane".
 "Feel the Same" is originally by Canadian singer Melanie Durrant and its original is identically named "Feel the Same".
 "Bring It Back" is originally by Canadian girl group Cookie Couture and its original identically named "Bring It Back".
 "Highlight" is the only plagiarized song of which the original version is unknown.
 "Swing" is originally by Canadian singer Georgia Murray and its original is named "We'll Never Know" which samples a Greek song "To Treno Fevgi Stis Okto" (English: The Train Leaves at Eight O'Clock) by Mikis Theodorakis.
 "How Did We Get" is originally by American singer Jason Derulo and its original is named "How Did We" which features singer Auburn.
 "Memory" is originally by the British band Second Person and is named "The Alphabet Song".

On October 21, 2010, the Seoul Central District Court stated, "He has acknowledged his crimes of obstruction of work, fraud, and forgery of documents, and has been sentenced for a year and six months."

Lee Hyun's 'Pride'
The management director of Bahnus Vacuum, said in an interview with a daily newspaper that he had found a 'statement of regret' written by Bahnus. The letter was, surprisingly, not for Lee Hyori but for a relatively unknown singer Lee Hyun.

Lee Hyun (Korean:이현 born December 27, 1980), is also a South Korean singer and a former member of the Korean pop group 5tion (pronounced: ocean). He is currently a member of the duo 'After Rain'. Lee Hyun sang 'Pride' (Korean:자존심 Romanized: Jajonshim) written by Bahnus in 2008 and received complaints from another composer 'Kim' just a few days after the song was released. Kim claimed the rhythm, melody and lyrics were identical to his creation.

When Lee Hyun asked Bahnus, the composer of the song, for an explanation Bahnus promised to drop his name from the credits and pay a refund for the song.

Bahnus Vacuum controversy and disbandment
Bahnus Vacuum(Korean: 바누스바큠) was a group, consisting out of 7 members of which Bahnus' was the leader. After it had been found out that 7 of the songs on Lee Hyori's H.logic were plagiarized there was an interview with one of the members of Bahnus Vacuum who said that he felt betrayed and disillusioned, he added "We lost everything, everything is over." After the plagiarism incident the group was also under attack, even though they were never officially accused, but just because they shared the word "Bahnus" in their group's name. Bahnus' contract was terminated May 10, 2010, which resulted in him having to leave Bahnus Vacuum. After reviewing their current circumstances the group Bahnus Vacuum decided to disband on May 25, 2010.

There is also a project group identically named 'Bahnus Vacuum', a South Korean girl group consisting out of 6 members.

References

Living people
South Korean composers
People involved in plagiarism controversies
Year of birth missing (living people)